Tilahar  is a village development committee in Parbat District in the Dhawalagiri Zone of central Nepal. At the time of the 1991 Nepal census it had a population of 4218 people living in 863 individual households. Tilahar is also home to a charity funding construction of schools around remote areas of Nepal. It raises funding through donations and exporting blankets to overseas.

References

External links
 Tilahar website
UN map of the municipalities of Parbat District

Populated places in Parbat District